Governor Belcher may refer to:

Jonathan Belcher (jurist) (1710–1776), Governor of Nova Scotia from 1760 to 1763
Jonathan Belcher (1682–1757), Governor of the Province of Massachusetts Bay from 1730 to 1741